The 1999 Stella Artois Championships was a men's tennis tournament played on grass courts at the Queen's Club in London in the United Kingdom and was part of the World Series of the 1999 ATP Tour. It was the 97th edition of the tournament and was held from 7 June through 14 June 1999. Second-seeded Pete Sampras won the singles title, his second at the event after 1995.

Finals

Singles

 Pete Sampras defeated  Tim Henman 6–7(1–7), 6–4, 7–6(7–4)
 It was Sampras' 1st title of the year and the 59th of his career.

Doubles

 Sébastien Lareau /  Alex O'Brien defeated  Todd Woodbridge /  Mark Woodforde 6–3, 7–6
 It was Lareau's 2nd title of the year and the 9th of his career. It was O'Brien's 2nd title of the year and the 9th of his career.

References

External links
 Official website
 ATP tournament profile

 
Stella Artois Championships
Queen's Club Championships
Stella Artois Championships
Stella Artois Championships
Stella Artois Championships